Khar-Us Lake (lit. "black water lake") is a lake located in western Mongolia in the Uvs Province between the districts of Ömnögovi and Ölgii.

Climate
The climate is cold. The average temperature is 1 ° C. The warmest month is July, at 21 ° C, and the coldest is January, at -22 ° C. The average rainfall is 420 millimeters per year. The wettest month is June, with 103 millimeters of rain, and the driest is March, with 2 millimeters.

References 

Lakes of Mongolia
Uvs Province